The men's floor exercise competition at the 1952 Summer Olympics was held at Messuhalli, Exhibition Hall I from 19 to 21  July. It was the fourth appearance of the event.

Competition format

The gymnastics format continued to use the aggregation format. Each nation entered a team of between five and eight gymnasts or up to three individual gymnasts. All entrants in the gymnastics competitions performed both a compulsory exercise and a voluntary exercise for each apparatus. The 2 exercise scores were summed to give a total for the apparatus.

No separate finals were contested.

For each exercise, four judges gave scores from 0 to 10 in one-tenth point increments. The top and bottom scores were discarded and the remaining two scores averaged to give the exercise total. Thus, exercise scores ranged from 0 to 10 and apparatus scores from 0 to 20. 

Only one attempt could be made in each of the two floor exercises.

Results

References

Men's floor
1952
Men's events at the 1952 Summer Olympics